Guy Leblanc was a politician from Quebec, Canada and a former Mayor of Trois-Rivières.

Background

He was born around 1947 and is a notary.

City Councillor

He was elected to the Trois-Rivières City Council in 1982 and was re-elected in 1986.

Mayor of Trois-Rivières

After Mayor Gilles Beaudoin announced that he would retire from politics in 1990, Leblanc made the decision to run for Mayor of Trois-Rivières and won.  He was re-elected in 1994 and 1998.  He did not run for re-election in 2001.

Provincial Politics

He also ran as a Liberal candidate in 1998 in the provincial district of Trois-Rivières against Parti Québécois incumbent Guy Julien.  Julien was re-elected by a large margin.

Footnotes

Living people
Mayors of Trois-Rivières
Trois-Rivières city councillors
Year of birth missing (living people)